Uropeltis woodmasoni, commonly known as Wood-Mason's earth snake or Woodmason's earth snake, is a species of snake in the family Uropeltidae. The species is endemic to India.

Etymology
The specific name, woodmasoni, is in honor of English zoologist James Wood-Mason.

Geographic range
U. woodmasoni is found in southern India (Anamalai Hills and Palni Hills, Travancore, Tinnevelly, Nilgiris).

Type locality: "Anamallys and Travancore". (Silybura melanogaster )

Type locality: "Palney hills, S India". (Silybura Wood-Masoni )

Type locality: "Pulney Mountains, 4,000 feet elevation". (Silybura nigra )

Habitat

Description
The dorsum of U. woodmasoni is blackish or dark violet, with a transverse series of small round yellow spots or ocelli. There is a lateral series of large yellow spots which may be confluent into a stripe. The venter is blackish or dark violet.

Adults may attain a total length (including tail) of 28 cm (11 inches).

The smooth dorsal scales are arranged in 19 rows at midbody, as well as behind the head. The ventrals number 163-178; the subcaudals number 6-11.

The snout is pointed. The portion of the rostral visible from above is longer than its distance from the frontal, in some specimens separating the nasals. The frontal is slightly longer than broad. The eye is small, its diameter slightly less than ½ the length of the ocular shield. The diameter of the body goes 23 to 30 times into the total length. The ventrals are about twice as large as the contiguous scales. The tail is rounded, and the dorsal scales of the tail are strongly pluricarinate. The terminal scute has two small points.

Reproduction
U. woodmasoni is viviparous.

Taxonomy
The scientific name Silybura melanogaster Günther is unavailable because it is a homonym of Uropeltis melanogaster Gray. Therefore, the specific name, melanogaster, was replaced with the next available specific name, woodmasoni, by Gans in 1966.

References

Further reading

Beddome RH (1878). "Descriptions of new Uropeltidae from Southern India, with Remarks on some previously-described Species". Proceedings of the Zoological Society of London 1878 (1): 154–155.
Beddome RH (1886). "An Account of the Earth-Snakes of the Peninsula of India and Ceylon". Annals and Magazine of Natural History, Fifth Series 17: 3-33.
Gans, Carl (1966). "Liste der rezenten Amphibien und Reptilien. Uropeltidae ". Das Terreich 84: 1-29. (in German).
Sharma RC (2003). Handbook: Indian Snakes. Kolkata: Zoological Survey of India. 292 pp. .
Smith MA (1943). The Fauna of British India, Ceylon and Burma, Including the Whole of the Indo-Chinese Sub-region. Reptilia and Amphibia. Vol. III.—Serpentes. London: Secretary of State for India. (Taylor and Francis, printers). xii + 583 pp. (Uropeltis wood-masoni, p. 79).
Theobald, Wm. (1876). Descriptive Catalogue of the Reptiles of British India. Calcutta: Thacker, Spink and Co. x + 238 + xxxviii + xiii pp. ("S. Wood-Masoni, Theob.", new species, p. 135).

Uropeltidae
Reptiles of India
Endemic fauna of the Western Ghats
Taxa named by William Theobald
Reptiles described in 1876